Pekka Alfred Vilmi (1 October 1915 – 16 February 1999) was a Finnish politician, born in Simo. He was a Member of the Parliament of Finland from 1963 to 1979, representing the Agrarian League, which renamed itself the Centre Party in 1965.

References

1915 births
1999 deaths
People from Simo, Finland
People from Oulu Province (Grand Duchy of Finland)
Centre Party (Finland) politicians
Members of the Parliament of Finland (1962–66)
Members of the Parliament of Finland (1966–70)
Members of the Parliament of Finland (1970–72)
Members of the Parliament of Finland (1972–75)
Members of the Parliament of Finland (1975–79)